Laddie is the word for boy in Scottish English.

Laddie may also refer to:

Novel and film adaptations
 Laddie, a True Blue Story, a 1913 novel by Gene Stratton-Porter, and its adaptations:
 Laddie (1926 film), an American drama
 Laddie (1935 film), an American film
 Laddie (1940 film), an American film

Fictional characters
 "Laddie", the title character in Son of Lassie, a 1945 film
 "Laddie", a dog in The Simpsons episode "The Canine Mutiny"
 "Laddie", a counterpart-of-sorts to Gaspode in Terry Pratchett's  Discworld series
 "Laddie", in the novel Cowboys for Christ
 "Laddie", a fictional toy character in the Wee Sing 1988 video: Grandpa's Magical Toys

People
 Laddie Cliff,  British dancer, choreographer, actor, producer, writer and director born Clifford Albyn Perry (1891–1937)
 Lauren Laddie Gale (1917–1996), American Hall-of-Fame basketball player
 Laddie Lewis, Guyanese cyclist who competed in the 1948 Olympics
 Laddie Lucas (1915–1998), Second World War Royal Air Force officer, journalist, amateur golfer and Member of Parliament nicknamed "Laddie"
 Ladislaus Laddie Outschoorn (1918–1994), Ceylonese cricketer
 Indra Lal Roy (1898–1918), Indian First World War flying ace nicknamed "Laddie"
 Hugh Laddie (1946–2008), British judge, lawyer and academic
 Mitch Laddie (born 1990), English guitarist, vocalist, songwriter and producer

Other uses
 "Laddie", a nickname for the whiskies from the Bruichladdich distillery
 Laddie Island, Canada, along with Split Island part of the North Belcher Islands

Lists of people by nickname